Head Cases: Serial Killers in the Delaware Valley is a 2013 horror film from director Anthony Spadaccini. The film continues the story told in Head Case.

Plot

Serial killer Wayne Montgomery committed 41 murders between 1979 and 2007, leaving behind an extensive library of his life's work. Now, a new generation carries on Wayne's legacy in a terrifying world where rules do not apply. Take a trip through the mind of one of history's most prolific serial killers - and his devoted followers who are out for blood.

References

External links
 

2013 films
Found footage films
American serial killer films
Films set in Delaware
2013 horror films
2010s English-language films
2010s American films